Several people are named Eichler:

 August W. Eichler (1839–1887), German botanist
 Caroline Eichler (1808/9–1843), German inventor, first woman to be awarded a patent (for her leg prosthesis)
 Eunice Eichler (1932–2017), New Zealand Salvation Army officer, nurse, midwife and open adoption advocate
 Glenn Eichler (born ), American TV comedy writer
 Jeremy Eichler (born 1974), American music critic
 Joseph Eichler (1900–1974), American residential real estate developer
 Martin Eichler (1912–1992), German mathematician
 Ralph Eichler (born 1950), Canadian politician

Eichler can also refer to:
 Eichler system, an early system of plant taxonomy
 an Eichler home, a primarily California-based style of midcentury architecture created by Joseph Eichler

German-language surnames
Jewish surnames